The 1972 Greenlandic Football Championship was the 2nd edition of the Greenlandic Football Championship. The final round was held in Nuuk. It was the first football championship won by Grønlands Seminarius Sportklub and the second national title in its history.

Final round

See also
Football in Greenland
Football Association of Greenland
Greenland national football team
Greenlandic Football Championship

References

Greenlandic Men's Football Championship seasons
Green
Green
Foot